Elsy Wameyo, also known as ELSY, is a Kenyan-born Australian singer-songwriter, mostly singing in the hip hop genre. Based in Adelaide, South Australia, Wameyo was awarded Young Kenyan of the Year in 2018, and won People's Choice Best Hip Hop Award at the annual South Australian Music Awards in 2019.

Early life
Wameyo was born in Nairobi, Kenya, and migrated to Australia with her family in 2006, when she was seven years old.

Music career
Wameyo has performed at Laneway and Groovin' the Moo festivals, and was a featured artist with Triple J Unearthed. As of 2019 she was signed with the independent record label created by her mentor, Gabriel Akon, aka DyspOra, Playback 808, but her November 2021 single, "Nilotic", was released on the Music in Exile label.

Lady Leshurr and Masego have shown interest in her music, and she has also played alongside Adrian Eagle, Printz Board, Aminé, Sampa the Great, Hilltop Hoods, and Duckwrth.  In October 2018, she appeared as ELSY, as one of two support acts for DOBBY (along with DyspOra) at Nexus Arts in Adelaide, as part of the OzAsia Festival.

Her work is informed by her strong belief in God, and she sees her talent as a gift from God. In 2019 she did not feel her African roots to be a huge influence on her music, but the response to her music in Kenya was enthusiastic when Akon took samples there. Her music is influenced by the gospel tradition as well as contemporary R&B, and in 2022 she cited Kendrick Lamar, Little Simz and Ludwig Göransson (who composed the music for the film Black Panther (film) as her biggest musical influences. She produces her own music, and directed her music video for her 2022 single "River Nile".

Her first single, "Intuition" was released in early 2018. This was followed by "Outcast" in November 2019 and "Pastor" in February 2020,. "Outcast" tells a personal story, largely based on the experience of growing up as an African in Australia, and the effect that racism has had on her and her peers. Both singles received positive reviews. It also explores the concept of "home" for African Australians.

She was studying full-time at university as of 2019, and also singing in her church. She spent some time travelling over the northern winter in 2019–2020, in Europe, the US and Kenya, during which she had a break from songwriting. Her 2020 single, "Pastor" uses an upbeat rhythm to explore feelings of anger, as she explores identity and belonging from the point of view of her parents, migrating to Australia.

She is scheduled to perform at WOMADelaide on Sunday 12 March 2022.

Her first EP, Nilotic was released on 1 April 2022, featuring the singles "River Nile" and "Nilotic", and four other tracks. Its name is a nod to her Nilotic roots, and the title track (released November 2021 on the label Music in Exile) is more overtly political, addressing issues of culture, race and police brutality. She mentioned Ota Benga, Trayvon Martin and George Floyd as part of her inspiration for the track.

Discography

As lead artist

As featured artist

Recognition and awards
2018: Winner, Young Kenyan of the Year at the Kenyan Association of South Australia (KASA)
 2021: Winner, Carclew Creative Achievement Award at the 7NEWS Young Achiever Awards - SA

J Awards
The J Awards are an annual series of Australian music awards that were established by the Australian Broadcasting Corporation's youth-focused radio station Triple J. They commenced in 2005.

! 
|-
| 2022
| Elsy Wameyo
| Unearthed Artist of the Year
| 
|

South Australian Music Awards
The South Australian Music Awards, also known as SA Music Awards, commonly SAM Awards, formerly Fowler's Live Music Awards (FLMA), are annual awards that exist to recognise, promote and celebrate excellence in the South Australian contemporary music industry.

! 
|-
| rowspan="2"| 2018
| rowspan="2"| Elsy Wameyo
| Best New Artist
| 
| rowspan="2"|  
|-
| Best World Music
| 
|-
| 2019
| Elsy Wameyo
| People's Choice Hip Hop Award
| 
| 
|-

References

Australian hip hop musicians
1990s births
Kenyan emigrants to Australia
Living people
Year of birth missing (living people)
Musicians from Adelaide